Thunder Bay—Rainy River is a federal electoral district in Ontario, Canada, that has been represented in the House of Commons of Canada since 2004. It first elected a member in the 2004 federal election.

History

It was created in 2003 from parts of Kenora—Rainy River and Thunder Bay—Atikokan ridings.

This riding gained a fraction of territory from Thunder Bay—Superior North during the 2012 electoral redistribution.

Geography

It consists of the Territorial District of Rainy River, and the part of the Territorial District of Thunder Bay lying south and west of a line drawn from the western limit of the territorial district east along the 6th Base Line, south along longitude 90o00 W, Dog River and the western shoreline of Dog Lake, west along the northern boundary of the Township of Fowler, south along its western boundary, and east along its southern boundary, south along the Kaministiquia River, east along the northern limit of the Township of Oliver Paipoonge, south along its eastern limit and along Pole Line Road, north along Thunder Bay Expressway (Highways 11 and 17), east along Harbour Expressway and Main Street to 110th Avenue, and due east to the eastern limit of the City of Thunder Bay, along that limit to the northeast corner of the Township of Neebing, and southeast to the US border.

Member of Parliament

This riding has elected the following Member of Parliament:

Election results

See also
 List of Canadian federal electoral districts
 Past Canadian electoral districts

References

Notes

External links
Riding history from the Library of Parliament
 2011 results from Elections Canada
 Campaign expense data from Elections Canada

Ontario federal electoral districts
Politics of Thunder Bay
Fort Frances